James Seymour Leslie (1 March 1958 – 22 February 2009) was a Unionist politician in Northern Ireland.

Born in Singida, Tanganyika Territory, and educated at Eton College, Leslie read law and land economy at Queens' College, Cambridge, before becoming a merchant banker. In 1996 he was an unsuccessful candidate in the Northern Ireland Forum election in North Antrim. Despite having no experience in politics, he was elected as an Ulster Unionist Party (UUP) member of the Northern Ireland Assembly for North Antrim in 1998.

Leslie did not stand in the 2003 Assembly election. In 2006, he resigned from the UUP and joined the Conservatives in Northern Ireland. In the same year, he was appointed High Sheriff of Antrim.

Leslie stood for the Conservatives in North Down at the 2007 Assembly election, but was not elected.  He died aged 50 on 22 February 2009, of a suspected heart attack while on holiday in Costa Rica.

References

1958 births
2009 deaths
Northern Ireland MLAs 1998–2003
Junior ministers of the Northern Ireland Assembly (since 1999)
Ulster Unionist Party MLAs
Conservative Party (UK) politicians
People educated at Eton College
Alumni of Queens' College, Cambridge
High Sheriffs of Antrim
Ulster Defence Regiment soldiers